
Lac du Vieux Émosson is a reservoir in Valais, Switzerland, in the municipality of Finhaut at an elevation of 2205 m. The lake drains into the reservoir Lac d'Émosson, 300 m below.

The arch dam Vieux Émosson was completed in 1955. Efforts to raise the dam  began in 2013. The lake forms the upper reservoir for the 900 MW Nant de Drance Hydropower Plant which began operations in 2022.

See also
List of lakes of Switzerland
List of mountain lakes of Switzerland

References

Lakes of Valais
Reservoirs in Switzerland